"" is a song by Italian rapper and singer Blanco, with featured vocals by Sfera Ebbasta. It was produced by Greg Willen and Michelangelo, and released as a single on 18 June 2021 by Island Records and Universal Music.

The song peaked at number 1 on the FIMI single chart for eight weeks and was certified sextuple platinum in Italy.

Music video
The music video for "", directed by Andrea Folino, premiered on 7 July 2021 via Blanco's YouTube channel.

Charts

Weekly charts

Year-end charts

Certifications

References

2021 songs
2021 singles
Island Records singles
Blanco (singer) songs
Sfera Ebbasta songs
Songs written by Blanco (singer)